Maryan Mysyk (born 2 October 1996) is a professional Ukrainian football midfielder who plays for Rukh Lviv.

Career
Mysyk is a product of the youth team system of FC Lviv. He signed a contract with FC Metalurh Donetsk in 2013.

He made his debut for FC Metalurh Donetsk in the game against FC Volyn Lutsk on 29 May 2015 in the Ukrainian Premier League. The media reported the interest of Borussia Dortmund and Tottenham Hotspur FC to Maryan Mysyk.

References

External links

Borussia Dortmund and Tottenham Hotspur FC are interested in Maryan Mysyk (Ukr)
Мисик Мар'ян Олегович  at The Ukrainian Premier League

1996 births
Living people
People from Radekhiv
Ukrainian footballers
FC Metalurh Donetsk players
Ukrainian Premier League players
Ukrainian First League players
Ukrainian Second League players
FC Stal Kamianske players
FC Vorskla Poltava players
FC Rukh Lviv players
NK Veres Rivne players
Association football midfielders
Ukraine youth international footballers
Ukraine under-21 international footballers
Sportspeople from Lviv Oblast